Corymbia trachyphloia, commonly known as the brown bloodwood, is a species of small to medium-sized tree that is endemic to eastern Australia. It has rough, tessellated bark on the trunk, often also on the larger branches, lance-shaped adult leaves, flower buds in groups of seven, white flowers and urn-shaped fruit.

Description
It has rough, brown and greyish bark on the trunk, often also on the larger branches. Flowering occurs from December to June and the flowers are white.

Taxonomy and naming
The brown bloodwood was first formally described in 1859 by Ferdinand von Mueller who gave it the name Eucalyptus trachyphloia and published the description in the Journal of the Proceedings of the Linnean Society, Botany from specimens collected near the Burnett River. In 1995, Ken Hill and Lawrie Johnson changed the name to Corymbia trachyphloia, publishing the change in the journal Telopea.

Distribution and habitat
Corymbia trachyphloia usually grows in sandy soils on plains and sandstone outcrops from the Goulburn River in New South Wales and north to the Blackdown Tableland, Carnarvon Range and Atherton Tableland in Queensland.

See also
List of Corymbia species

References

trachyphloia
Myrtales of Australia
Flora of Queensland
Flora of New South Wales
Plants described in 1859
Taxa named by Ferdinand von Mueller